Operation Karbala 8 (Persian: عملیات کربلای ۸) was an operation which was commenced by Iran on 7 April 1987 with the --Islamic-- code of "Ya Saheb al-Zaman" (Persian: یا صاحب الزمان).

Operation Karbala 8 was launched with the goal of destruction of Iraqi forces, plus strengthening the obtained positions of operation Karbala 5 in 5 days by Iran in the east of Basrah operation area (Shalamcheh) by the  Islamic Revolutionary Guard Corps ground forces.

During the night of April 6 to 7, Iranian command attacked. 40,000 Iranian Pasdaran attempted to breach the last line of defense protecting access to Basra. The Iranian offensive failed as the Iraqis mastered defensive combat and had terrifying firepower at their disposal. On April 9 and 12 the Iranian government went against its principles and tried to win the battle by using chemical weapons. At nightfall Iranian artillery poured phosgene gas in the Iraqi 3rd Army Corps' sector. These bombings caused only minimal Iraqi losses of 20 dead and 200 wounded, and did not break the defensive layout around Basra.

Iran claimed that 250 persons from Iran and 5,000 persons from Iraqi army were killed, and that 200 Iraqis were captured by Iranian forces -- as well as the spoils of war which were obtained by Iran. It also claimed that Iraqi forces used chemical weapons against Iran at this operation.

See also 
 Operation Karbala-1
 Operation Karbala-2
 Operation Karbala-4
 Operation Karbala-5
 Operation Karbala-6
 Operation Karbala-7
 Operation Karbala-9
 Operation Karbala-10

References 

Operations Karbala
Military operations of the Iran–Iraq War